Jamie Jones (born 18 February 1989) is an English professional footballer who plays as a goalkeeper for Wigan Athletic.

Jones has previously played for Leyton Orient, Preston North End and Stevenage, and has had loan spells with Coventry City, Rochdale and Colchester United.

Club career

Everton
Born in Kirkby, Merseyside, Jones signed his first professional contract with Everton on 4 July 2007. In the 2007–08 season he managed some reserve games but failed to secure a new contract at Everton and so left the club at the end of the season and signed a contract with Leyton Orient.

Leyton Orient
On 30 June 2008, Jones signed a two-year contract with League One side Leyton Orient. He signed for the club stating that he was happy to be fighting for a starting place with fellow goalkeeper Glenn Morris. Jones made his debut in a League Cup match against Southend United. He made his league debut in a 2–1 defeat to Scunthorpe United. On 10 October 2009, Jones was knocked unconscious after receiving a blow to the head by teammate Ben Chorley after a goalmouth scramble. He was stretchered off the pitch and taken to hospital. After Glenn Morris' departure from the club, Jones was promoted to the No. 1 shirt from his previous No. 12.

During a League One fixture at Swindon Town in November 2013, a spectator ran onto the pitch and aimed punches at Jones. Jones was unhurt, the match continued, and the perpetrator was arrested and later convicted.

Jones played in 179 games for Leyton Orient.

Preston North End
Jones signed a two-year deal with Preston North End on 6 June 2014 after turning down an extension of contract at Leyton Orient.

Rochdale (loan)

On 26 February 2015, Jones signed for Rochdale on a loan until the end of the season. Jones made his Rochdale debut on 28 February 2015, in a 1–0 defeat against Bristol City. He made his home debut on 3 March, in a 4–0 win against Crewe Alexandra, keeping a clean sheet. On 18 April, in a game against Gillingham, Jones charged out of his box and brought down Gillingham's striker Cody McDonald, with players from both sides piling into the melee which followed. It had also looked like Jones aimed a punch at one of the Gillingham's players in the scuffle and was sent off. He played his last game for the club in 2–3 defeat against Milton Keynes Dons on 25 April 2015. He played 13 times for Rochdale in the league that season, as they finished a very credible 8th place, their highest-ever league placing.

Colchester United (loan)
On 11 September 2015, Jones joined League One side Colchester United on a 3-month loan.

Wigan Athletic
On 7 August 2017, Jones signed for League One side Wigan Athletic on a one-year contract after rejecting a new contract at Stevenage. Wigan entered into contract talks with him at the end of the 2017–18 season. He sold his League One winners medal to help raise money for the club, with Wigan being in administration – only for the fan that bought it to give it back to him as a gift. Jones also became the club's captain, starting with 2020–21 season.

Entering the 2021–22 season, Jones was no longer the first-choice goalkeeper, as summer signing Ben Amos from Charlton had taken over the role. In addition, the on-field captaincy was transferred away from Jones to Tendayi Darikwa by manager Leam Richardson as part of changes entering his first full season in charge. Jones was the goalkeeper for Wigan's League Cup campaign, which began with consecutive penalty shootout wins over Hull and Bolton. Jones took a penalty in both shootouts, and saved one in the second shootout.

Career statistics

Honours
Wigan Athletic
EFL League One: 2017–18

References

External links

Profile at the Wigan Athletic F.C. website

1989 births
Living people
People from Kirkby
Footballers from Merseyside
English footballers
Association football goalkeepers
Everton F.C. players
Leyton Orient F.C. players
Preston North End F.C. players
Coventry City F.C. players
Rochdale A.F.C. players
Colchester United F.C. players
Stevenage F.C. players
Wigan Athletic F.C. players
English Football League players